Heceta Beach is an unincorporated community in Lane County, Oregon, United States, located west of U.S. Route 101 next to the Pacific Ocean. It is the next settlement north of the Siuslaw River and Florence and is within the Florence urban growth boundary. Heceta Beach was platted in 1915. Lane County maintains a small county park there, with beach access, as well as restrooms and picnic tables.

Driftwood Shores, a hotel and conference center in Heceta Beach, was annexed to Florence in 2008.

Demographics

See also
Heceta Head

References

Oregon Coast
Unincorporated communities in Lane County, Oregon
1915 establishments in Oregon
Unincorporated communities in Oregon